Avalancha is a steel roller coaster at Xetulul Theme Park that opened in 2002.

References